The Château de Lascoux, also Château de Celles, is a château in Celles, Dordogne, Nouvelle-Aquitaine, France. It was built in the 16th century.

Notable people
Armand de Foucauld de Pontbriand was born here.

References

Further reading
 Guy Penaud, Dictionnaire des châteaux du Périgord, p.68, éditions Sud Ouest, 1996 

Châteaux in Dordogne